Marc Soriano (7 July 1918, in Cairo – 18 December 1994) was a 20th-century French philosopher.

After the death of his father, his family went to Italy. He stayed in Pisa between 1921 and 1927, then went to live in Paris. A pupil at Lycée Condorcet in Paris, he was the only khâgneux received at the École Normale Supérieure in 1939, but his name is not on the directories. Mobilized in 1939, wounded in April 1940, he joined the Résistance in 1942. He was received in the first place at the December special session of the Aggregation of Philosophy Competition of 1945. He specialized in tales, especially those of Charles Perrault. Suffering from myasthenia gravis since 1978, which had caused him to lose the use of speech, he died on 18 December 1994.

A laureate of the Prix Sainte-Beuve in 1968 for his study les Contes de Perrault, culture savante et tradition populaire, the Académie française also bestowed him its Prix d'Académie in 1991 for all his work.

He was violinist Denise Soriano-Boucherit's brother.

Works 
1968: Les Contes de Perrault, culture savante et traditions populaires, Gallimard, series "La Bibliothèque des idées"
1978: Portrait de l'artiste jeune, suivi des quatre premiers textes publiés de Jules Verne. Postface by Ray Bradbury. Gallimard
1981: La Semaine de la comète. Rapport secret sur l'enfance et la jeunesse au XIXe, Stock
1975: Guide de la littérature pour la jeunesse, Flammarion
1993: Les Secrets du violon. Souvenirs de Jules Boucherit (1877–1962), Paris, Editions des Cendres

References

External links 
 Marc Soriano on Encyclopedia Universalis
 Mort de Marc Soriano, écrivain et psychanalyste on Libération (20 December 1994)
 Marc Sorian on Contes de Fée
 Marc Soriano on the site of the Académie française

20th-century French philosophers
1918 births
Lycée Condorcet alumni
20th-century French writers
Prix Sainte-Beuve winners
École Normale Supérieure alumni
French Resistance members
1994 deaths
Deaths from myasthenia gravis
Egyptian expatriates in Italy
Egyptian emigrants to France